Pai gow is a Chinese gambling game, played with a set of 32 Chinese dominoes. It is played in major casinos in China (including Macau); the United States (including Boston, Massachusetts; Las Vegas, Nevada; Reno, Nevada; Connecticut; Atlantic City, New Jersey; Pennsylvania; Mississippi; and cardrooms in California); Canada (including Edmonton, Alberta and Calgary, Alberta); Australia; and New Zealand.

The name "pai gow" is sometimes used to refer to a card game called pai gow poker (or “double-hand poker”), which is loosely based on pai gow.

History
Pai Gow is the first documented form of dominoes, originating in China before or during the Song Dynasty. It is also the ancestor of modern, western dominoes. The name literally means "make nine" after the normal maximum hand, and the original game was modeled after both a Chinese creation myth, and military organization in China at that time (ranks one through nine).

The pairs actually tell the story of creation:
 Gee Joon is the highest ranked pair, and is the Supreme Creator of the universe
 Teen (天) is the heavens, the first thing Gee Joon created.
 Day (地) is the earth itself, placed under the heavens.
 Yun (人) is man, whom Gee Joon made to live upon the earth. 
 Gor (鵝) is geese, made for man to eat.
 Mooy (梅) is plum flowers, to give the earth beauty.

Each subsequent pair is another step in the story...robes (Bon) for man to wear, a hatchet (Foo) to chop wood, partitions (Ping) for a house, man's seventh (Tit) and eighth (Look) children.

Rules

Starting
Tiles are shuffled on the table and are arranged into eight face-down stacks of four tiles each in an assembly known as the woodpile. Individual stacks or tiles may then be moved in specific ways to rearrange the woodpile, after which the players place their bets.

Next, each player (including the dealer) is given one stack of tiles and must use them to form two hands of two tiles each. The hand with the lower value is called the front hand, and the hand with the higher value is called the rear hand. If a player's front hand beats the dealer's front hand, and the player's rear hand beats the dealer's rear hand, then that player wins the bet. If a player's front and rear hands both lose to the dealer's respective hands, the player loses the bet. If one hand wins and the other loses, the player is said to push, and gets back only the money he or she bet. Generally seven players will play, and each player's hands are compared only against the dealer's hands; comparisons are always front-front and rear-rear, never one of each.

There are 35,960 possible ways to select 4 of the 32 tiles when the 32 tiles are considered distinguishable. However, there are 3,620 distinct sets of 4 tiles when the tiles of a pair are considered indistinguishable. There are 496 ways to select 2 of the 32 tiles when the 32 tiles are considered distinguishable. There are 136 distinct hands (pairs of tiles) when the tiles of a pair are considered indistinguishable.

Basic scoring
The name "pai gow" is loosely translated as "make nine" or "card nine". This reflects the fact that, with a few high-scoring exceptions, the maximum score for a hand is nine. If a hand consists of two tiles that do not form a pair, its value is determined by adding up the total number of pips on the tiles and dropping the tens digit (if any). Examples:

 1–3 with 2-3: value 9 (nine pips altogether)
 2–3 with 5-6: value 6 (16 pips; drop the 10)
 5–5 with 4-6: value 0 (20 pips; ones digit is zero)

Gongs and Wongs
There are special ways in which a hand can score more than nine points. The double-one tiles and double-six tiles are known as the Day and Teen tiles, respectively. The combination of a Day or Teen with an eight results in a Gong, worth 10 points, while putting either of them with a nine creates a Wong, worth 11. However, when a Day or Teen is paired with any other tile, the standard scoring rules apply.

Gee Joon tiles
The 1-2 and the 2-4 tiles are called Gee Joon tiles and act as limited wild cards. When used as part of a hand, these tiles may be scored as either 3 or 6, whichever results in a higher hand value. For example, a hand of 1-2 and 5-6 scores as seven rather than four.

Pairs

The 32 tiles in a Chinese dominoes set can be arranged into 16 pairs, as shown in the picture at the top of this article. Eleven of these pairs have identical tiles, and five of these pairs are made up of two tiles that score the same, but look different. (The latter group includes the Gee Joon tiles, which can score the same, whether as three or six.) Any hand consisting of a pair outscores a non-pair, regardless of the pip counts. (Pairs are often thought of as being worth 12 points each.)

When the player and dealer both have a pair, the higher-ranked pair wins. Ranking is determined not by the sum of the tiles' pips, but rather by aesthetics; the order must be memorized. The highest pairs are the Gee Joon tiles, the Teens, the Days, and the red eights. The lowest pairs are the mismatched nines, eights, sevens, and fives.

Ties
When the player and dealer display hands with the same score, the one with the highest-valued tile (based on the pair rankings described above) is the winner. For example, a player's hand of 3-4 and 2-2 and a dealer's hand of 5-6 and 5-5 would each score one point. However, since the dealer's 5-5 outranks the other three tiles, he would win the hand.

If the scores are tied, and if the player and dealer each have an identical highest-ranking tile, then the dealer wins. For example, if the player held 2-2 and 1–6, and the dealer held 2-2 and 3–4, the dealer would win since the scores (1 each) and the higher tiles (2-2) are the same. The lower-ranked tile in each hand is never used to break a tie.

There are two exceptions to the method described above. First, although the Gee Joon tiles form the highest-ranking pair when used together, they are considered to have no value individually when evaluating ties. Second, any zero-zero tie is won by the dealer, regardless of the tiles in the two hands.

Strategy
The key element of pai gow strategy is to present the optimal front and rear hands based on the tiles dealt to the player. There are three ways to arrange four tiles into two hands when no two of them form a pair. However, if there is at least one pair among the tiles, there are only two distinct ways to form two hands.

Using the tiles shown at right, the following hands and scores are possible:

A and B (0), C and D (0)
A and C (5), B and D (5)
A and D (3), B and C (7)

The player must decide which combination is most likely to give a set of front/rear hands that can beat the dealer, or at least break a tie in the player's favor. In some cases, a player with weaker tiles may deliberately attempt to attain a push so as to avoid losing the bet outright. Many players rely on superstition or tradition to choose tile pairings.

See also

 Kiu kiu
 Tien Gow
 Pusoy dos

References

External links

 Scoring chart
 Pai gow lore at Wizard of Odds website (Michael Shackleford)

Cantonese words and phrases
Chinese games
Chinese dominoes
Gambling games